Cephalodiplosporium elegans is a species of fungi in the Nectriaceae.

References

External links 

 Cephalodiplosporium elegans at Mycobank

Nectriaceae
Fungi described in 1961